The Gotham Independent Film Audience Award was one of the annual Gotham Independent Film Awards awarded between 2010 and 2020. The winner was determined via an online vote, in earlier years by the independent film community and film fans (2010–2013), and later by members of the Independent Filmmaker Project (2014–2020).

Nomination eligibility
From 2010 to 2013, the five nominees were selected in a first round of online voting from American films that had won an audience award at an American or Canadian film festival in the previous year. Beginning in 2014, the nominees were the films nominated for Best Feature, Best Documentary, and Breakthrough Director. In 2020, the nominees for the newly created award for Best International Feature were also nominated for this award.

Winners and nominees

2010s

2020s

References

Audience Award
Awards established in 2010
Awards disestablished in 2020